Shogun is a board wargame set in feudal Japan, first released in 1986 by game maker Milton Bradley.

Publication history
Shogun, designed by Michael Gray, was first released in 1986 by Milton Bradley as part of their Gamemaster series. It was renamed to Samurai Swords in its first re-release (1995) to disambiguate it from other games with the same name (in particular, James Clavell's Shogun, a wargame with a similar theme, released in 1983), and renamed again to Ikusa in its 2011 re-release under Hasbro's Avalon Hill banner.

Gameplay
Set in feudal Japan, two to five players take control of a fictional warlord and pit their armies against one another in hopes of winning the title Shogun.

Each player controls a number of daimyō, or generals, who command an army. Other forces on the board represent militia and garrisons. Players have the option of hiring ronin (mercenaries). There is a ninja, principally used as an assassin against enemy daimyō. Units include samurai swordsmen and bowmen, and ashigaru spearmen and gunners. 

Income, called koku, is derived from control of territories. Players attempt to destroy their rivals in battle and seize their territories. Some interesting features include the orchestration of armies in battle, the emphasis on generals (who gain levels, much like roleplaying game characters), and the unpredictable element of ronin placement.

The game uses six twelve-sided dice. The trays for units are designed to resemble Japanese fortresses, and each player receives a small katana (to display the order in which players take their turns).

Reception
Shogun was awarded the Origins Award for "Best Pre-20th Century Boardgame of 1987" and "Best Graphic Presentation of a Boardgame of 1987".

David M. Ewalt of Forbes commented on the 2011 release of Ikusa: "The game formerly known as Samurai Swords (and before that as Shogun) gets another makeover. Still the same strategy classic where players compete to rule feudal Japan, but the box, board and pieces have been updated. Not cheap, but the redesign looks great and the game’s as fun as ever."

Reviews
Backstab #4
Isaac Asimov's Science Fiction Magazine v12 n8 (1988 08)

References

External links

Rules of Shogun
Wizards of the Coast/Avalon Hill Ikusa product page

Board games about history
Board games introduced in 1986
Board wargames set in the Middle Ages
Japan in non-Japanese culture
Milton Bradley Company games
Origins Award winners
Sengoku period in fiction